Naughty Marietta may refer to:
Naughty Marietta (operetta), the original 1910 Victor Herbert operetta
Naughty Marietta (film), the 1935 film version starring Jeanette MacDonald and Nelson Eddy
Naughty Marietta (television), the 1955 live television version of the operetta starring Patrice Munsel and Alfred Drake

See also 
 Naughty Cinderella, 1933 British comedy film
 Naughty Girl (disambiguation)